The Ashanti Pioneer  (1939 – 1962)  was a private newspaper in Ghana.

History 
It was founded in Kumasi during World War II by two operators of the Abura Printing Works in 1939. As the war was ending, the newspaper shifted coverage from war to nationalist movement within Ghana. It covered the eventual start of political parties and also played a role in the spreading of information about the new political parties, namely the United Gold Coast Convention (UGCC) with J. B. Danquah as the leader and the Convention People's Party (CPP) led by Dr Kwame Nkrumah.

In October 1962, the government closed down the Ashanti Pioneer and arrested its staff.

References 

Newspapers published in Ghana
Newspapers established in 1930
1930 establishments in Gold Coast (British colony)